The 2020 Vanderbilt Commodores football team represented Vanderbilt University in the 2020 NCAA Division I FBS football season. The Commodores played their home games at Vanderbilt Stadium in Nashville, Tennessee, and competed in the Eastern Division of the Southeastern Conference (SEC). They were led by interim head coach Todd Fitch, who replaced Derek Mason after his firing on November 29, 2020. On December 14, 2020, Clark Lea was hired as head coach.

On November 28, in game against Missouri, Vanderbilt's Sarah Fuller became the first woman to play in a Power Five conference game by delivering the opening kickoff for the second half. Fuller, the Commodores' goalkeeper on the school's SEC championship women's soccer team, was added to the football roster after the team's regular kicking specialists had to be quarantined due to COVID-19 protocols.

Previous season
The Commodores finished the 2019 season 3–9, 1–7 in SEC play to finish in last place in the Eastern Division.

Preseason

Award watch lists
Listed in the order that they were released

SEC Media Days
In the preseason media poll, Vanderbilt was predicted to finish in last place in the East Division.

Schedule
Vanderbilt had games scheduled against Colorado State, Kansas State, Louisiana Tech and Mercer, which were all canceled due to the COVID-19 pandemic.

The game between Vanderbilt and Missouri was originally scheduled to take place on October 17.  However, due to COVID-19 management requirements in response to positive tests and subsequent quarantine of individuals within the Vanderbilt program, the game was rescheduled for December 12. The SEC postponed Tennessee vs. Vanderbilt to facilitate the rescheduling of the Vanderbilt–Missouri game. The shuffling allows for the opportunity for all 14 SEC teams to play 10 regular-season games.

Players drafted into the NFL

References

Vanderbilt
Vanderbilt Commodores football seasons
College football winless seasons
Vanderbilt Commodores football